Big Brother 1 is the first season of the Polish reality television series Big Brother. The show followed a number of contestants, known as housemates, who are isolated from the outside world for an extended period of time in a custom-built house. Each week, one of the housemates is evicted by a public vote, with the last housemate remaining winning a cash prize.

The show was started on March 3, 2001 and concluded on June 17, 2001, last 107 days. For the needs of Big Brother, SMS Premium services were introduced for the first time in Poland.

Martyna Wojciechowska and Grzegorz Miecugow host the main show. Janusz Dzięcioł walked out as the winner. The prize for him is 500.000 PLN. The final of the season brought viewership to almost 10 million viewers making it the most-watched TV show in Poland in 2001.

Big Brother: Ty Wybierasz
On 25 February, as part of Big Brother: Ty Wybierasz (lit. Big Brother: You Choose), the public vote was open to choose 2 candidates to enter the house from among 5 male candidates (Artur Parlewicz, Jakub Denys, Sebastian Florek, Wojciech Kromka and Wojciech Tęczyński) and 5 female candidates (Agnieszka Broda, Agnieszka Podgórska, Iwona Górnicka, Małgorzata Maier and Patrycja Strzemiecka). The public chose Małgorzata Maier and Sebastian Florek to enter the house on 3 March.

Patrycja Strzemiecka and Wojciech Kromka entered the house after Piotr Lato was ejected from the house.

Housemates

Nominations Table

Note
 Patrycja & Wojciech, as new Housemates, are automatically up for eviction in a separate vote to the nominations.

References

External links 
 Official site

01
2001 Polish television seasons